Tomares mauretanicus, the Moroccan hairstreak, is a butterfly of the family Lycaenidae.

Description
The wingspan is 28–30 mm.

Habitat
Grassy places from sea level to 2400 m

Distribution
It is found only in northern Africa.

Life cycle and behaviour
The butterfly flies from January to March. In the High Atlas it flies into June.

The larvae feed on Hippocrepis multisiliquosa, Hippocrepis minor, Hedysarum pallidum, Astragalus epiglottis and Astragalus pentaglottis. The eggs are laid in clusters on the leaves of the host plant. The species flies on hot, dry hillsides and it has been known to 'hilltop'.

Subspecies
Tomares mauretanicus mauretanicus (Algeria)
Tomares mauretanicus antonius (Brévignon, 1984) (Middle Atlas in Morocco)
Tomares mauretanicus amelnorum (Tarrier, 1997) (Anti-Atlas in Morocco)

References

Further reading
 Higgins, L. G. and N. D. Riley (1971). Europas dagsommerfugle. Gads Forlag.
 Tennent, John (1996). The Butterflies of Morocco, Algeria and Tunisia. Gem Publishing Company.
 Tolman, Tom (1997). Europas sommerfugle. Gads Forlag.

Theclinae
Butterflies described in 1849